Henry Manly Derward Wright (24 February 1882 – 5 February 1953) was an Australian rules footballer who played with Melbourne in the Victorian Football League (VFL).

Notes

External links 

1882 births
1953 deaths
Australian rules footballers from Bendigo
Melbourne Football Club players